The Coptic Orthodox Church has many churches and congregations in Europe and on 2 June 1974 Pope Shenouda III   received into the Coptic Orthodox Patriarchate of Alexandria a native Orthodox Church in France known as the French Orthodox Eparchy, along with their Primate, who in turn was accepted after consecration into the Episcopate, in the Holy Synod of the Church of Alexandria and hence was appointed their Primate Marcos (Mark), as the first Bishop and Athanasius as  Chorbishop of The French Orthodox Eparchy. There are 15 Coptic Bishops serving in Europe.
 
Currently there are many metropolitans and bishops serving in Europe.

Austria
Bishop in Austria:
 Gabriel, Bishop of the Holy Diocese of Vienna and all Austria.

France

On 18 June 1994 Pope Shenouda III raised the French Orthodox Eparchy to the full status of the French Coptic Orthodox Church

On 19 June 1994, in the presence of 62 metropolitans and bishops of the Coptic Orthodox Church, Pope Shenouda III elevated Marcos (Mark) as the first metropolitan of the Holy Metropolis of Toulon & All France and Primate of  the French Coptic Orthodox Church and Athanasius as the Auxiliary Bishop (assistant) to Marcos.

Bishops 

The French Coptic Orthodox Church has a diocesan bishop as well as about 11–12 priests and several deacons in about 12–15 parishes and missions across France.

 Athanasios, Diocesan Bishop of the Holy Diocese of Marseille and Primate of the Holy Metropolis of Toulon and of all France, that is The French Coptic Orthodox Church.
 Marc, Diocesan Bishop of Paris and all Northern France
 Luka (Luke), Diocesan Bishop of the Holy Diocese of Geneva (Switzerland) and Southern France

The Church is integrated within the Church of Alexandria, but is considered autonomous in matters of governance.

Germany

Bishops:
 Damian, Bishop of the Holy Diocese of Höxter-Brenkenhausen and Abbot of the Monastery of St. Mary & St. Maurice. 
 Michail, Bishop & Abbot of the Monastery of Saint Anthony the Great in Kroeffelbach, Germany.
Currently, there are a few thousand Orthodox Copts in Germany, with several monasteries and churches.

Italy
Bishops:
 Barnaba, Bishop of the Holy Diocese of Turin, Rome and Southern Italy.
 Antonio, Bishop of the Holy Diocese of Milan and Northern Italy & Abbot of the Monastery of Saint Shenouda the Archimandrite in Milan.

The Netherlands

Bishop in Netherlands:

Arsany (Arsanios), Diocesan Bishop of the Holy Diocese of Amsterdam and all the Netherlands & affiliate jurisdictions.

There is a large Coptic Orthodox community in the Netherlands, mainly in the major cities. Currently, they have Churches in Amsterdam, Assen, Eindhoven, Enschede, The Hague, Kapelle, Leeuwarden, Utrecht and Velsen-Noord.

Great Britain and Ireland

Bishops:
Bishop Missael, Bishop of the Holy Diocese of the Midlands, England (see ukmidcopts.org)
 Bishop Anthony, Bishop of the Holy Diocese of Ireland, Scotland and North East England
 Bishop Angaelos, Bishop of the Holy Diocese of London
 Eritrean church; Bishop Markos (Mark), Bishop of the Eritrean Church in the United Kingdom, Member of the Eritrean Holy Synod

Scandinavian Countries (Sweden, Denmark, Norway)

Bishop:
Abakir (Apa Cyrrhus), Diocesan Bishop of the Holy Diocese of Stockholm and of all Scandinavia.

Greece and Cyprus

Bishop:
Pavlos (Paul), Diocesan Bishop of the Holy Diocese of Athens, all Greece and Cyprus

Central Europe (Hungary, Czech Republic, Poland, Romania and Slovakia)

Bishop:
Giovanni, Diocesan Bishop of the Holy Diocese of Central Europe (Hungary, Czech Republic, Poland, Romania & Slovakia)

See also
Coptic diaspora

References

External links
Coptic Churches in Europe websites
Coptic Church in Eindhoven
The French Coptic  Orthodox Church website
Coptic Orthodox Diocese of the Midlands, U.K. website
Coptic Orthodox Centre Stevenage